Marc Schneier (born January 26, 1959) is an American rabbi and president of The Foundation for Ethnic Understanding. Schneier previously served as vice-president of the World Jewish Congress.

Career
According to Tablet, Schneier "is a polarizing figure. To his supporters, [he] is a peerless institution-builder and community leader. To his detractors, he's indulged an appetite for fame and wealth while plowing his way through five marriages, destroying fragile bonds of trust with his congregants in the process."

In 1999, Schneier authored the book Shared Dreams: Martin Luther King Jr. and the Jewish Community which is the first reference to the Letter to an Anti-Zionist Friend, an open letter allegedly written by Martin Luther King Jr. which was later determined to be a hoax.

In 2001, Schneier reportedly held a secret meeting with Nation of Islam leader Louis Farrakhan, known for espousing antisemitic views. Schneier has also worked together with Council on American–Islamic Relations (CAIR), the American Muslim advocacy organization, which the organized American Jewish community has long viewed as "out of bounds" for its alleged ties to the Palestinian terrorist organization Hamas and its broader anti-Israel activity and rhetoric.

The Rabbinical Council of America (RCA) decided in 2010 to investigate Rabbi Schneier for breaching the code of ethics by carrying on an extramarital relationship. The RCA executive committee voted to expel Schneier in June 2015.

In 2013, Schneier co-authored with Imam Shamsi Ali the book Sons of Abraham: A Candid Conversation about the Issues That Divide and Unite Jews and Muslims.

Under pressure from his congregation for his multiple divorces and philandering, Schneier resigned in 2016 from his pulpit position at the Hampton Synagogue, which he had founded in 1990. Congregants had threatened to withhold pledges and payments until he left the synagogue. At the time, his synagogue salary was $800,000.

In 2018, Tablet reported that Schneier helped connect the Qatari government to Jewish American lobbyist Nicolas Muzin. In 2017 Qatar hired Nick Muzin to improve its relations with the Trump Administration and the Jewish American community. Muzin's work reportedly included arranging meetings between Qatari officials and leaders of Jewish and pro-Israel advocacy groups.

Personal life

Rabbi Schneier has been married six times.

His first, brief marriage, was to Elissa Shay, in 1981. They married while still studying at university. He next married Esther Melamed around 1990; they divorced in 1992. He remarried a year later to Toby Gotesman. They had one child, Brendan, in 1999. Schneier divorced Gotesman due to his affair with Tobi Rubinstein in 2005; Rubinstein became his fourth wife a year later. That marriage lasted five years, again ending in divorce over an affar with Gitty Leiner, who became his 5th wife on October 6, 2013. Scheiner and Leiner had a daughter, Brooke, a few months later. They divorced in 2014. Schneier's sixth marriage, to Israeli Simi Teitelbaum, took place in March, 2017.

In June 2010, during his fourth divorce proceedings, Schneier announced the divorce to his congregation, stating that he had been suffering from bi-polar disorder. Ken Sunshine, a spokesman for Schneier, confirmed that the rabbi had been dealing with "a very serious illness." Congregants expressed doubt. Schneier married his 5th wife, on October 6, 2013. For his 50th birthday, his fourth wife, Tobi Rubinstein-Schneier, arranged for a 400 lb. endangered Asian lion to be donated in his honor at the Jerusalem Biblical Zoo.  The lion was renamed "Rabbi Marc".

It was during his fifth divorce that he resigned under pressure from his synagogue.

In February 2018, it was reported that the State of Florida has ordered Schneier pay $5,000 a month for $64,594 in unpaid child support he owes to his third wife for the care of their then-19 year old son.

He is the son of Rabbi Arthur Schneier.

References

American Orthodox rabbis
Living people
American anti-racism activists
Yeshiva University alumni
1959 births
20th-century American rabbis
21st-century American rabbis
Jewish anti-racism activists
People in interfaith dialogue
People with bipolar disorder